Elvis Anthony (born July 4, 1970) is an Antigua and Barbudan football player. He has played for Antigua and Barbuda national team.

National team statistics

References

1970 births
Living people
Antigua and Barbuda footballers
Antigua and Barbuda international footballers
Association football goalkeepers